Polybothris sumptuosa is a species of beetles in the family Buprestidae.

Description
This jewel beetle shows various chromatic forms. There are a shiny metallic blue form (P. sumptuosa gemma), a dark green form (P. sumptuosa superba) and a dark green to black form (P. sumptuosa sumptuosa).

Distribution
These wood boring beetles can be found in Madagascar.

References
 Biolib
 Universal Biological Indexer
 Beetles of Madagascar. 

sumptuosa
Buprestidae
Beetles described in 1833